Ceroplesis massaica is a species of beetle in the family Cerambycidae. It was described by Per Olof Christopher Aurivillius in 1908. It is known from Tanzania and Kenya. It contains the variety Ceroplesis massaica var. rufofasciata.

References

massaica
Beetles described in 1908